Dominioni is a surname. Notable people with the surname include:

Camillo Caccia Dominioni (1877–1946), Italian Roman Catholic cardinal 
Carlo Caccia Dominioni (1802–1866), Italian prelate
Luigi Caccia Dominioni (1913–2016), Italian architect and furniture designer
Paolo Caccia Dominioni (1896–1992), Italian soldier